The Sicu is a tributary of the river Fizeș in Romania. It flows into the Fizeș in Sântioana. Lake Sântejude is located on this river.

References

Rivers of Romania
Rivers of Cluj County